The Peugeot 208 is a supermini car (B-segment in Europe) produced by the French automaker Peugeot. Unveiled at the Geneva Motor Show in March 2012 and positioned below bigger 308 and above smaller 108. The 208 replaced the 207 in 2012, and the car is currently at its second generation.



First generation (A9; 2012)

In November 2011, the initial 208 models were three-door hatchbacks produced at Peugeot's new plant in Trnava, Slovakia. As five-door hatchbacks became available in June 2012, production also started at Peugeot's French plants located in Mulhouse and Poissy.

The first-generation 208, developed under the code name "A9," is constructed on the PSA PF1 platform.

The design work of the first-generation 208 was led by Pierre Authier, with Sylvain Henry as the exterior designer. Adam Bazydlo was responsible for the interior design, and Marie Sanou oversaw color and trim. The vehicle is equipped with a tablet computer-like display, a panoramic glass roof surrounded by LED lights, and has a relatively low drag coefficient of 0.29.

The three-door 208 was discontinued in mid-2018, and Peugeot ceased production of the first-generation 208 in Europe in 2019. From January 2013 to March 2020, the first-generation 208 was produced in Brazil. It was replaced with the second-generation model, which is imported from Argentina.

Although a high-performance 208 R was planned for the lineup, it was never released. It would have been positioned above the 208 GTi.

208 GTi 
The 208 GTi was introduced in September 2012 as the performance model of the first-generation 208. Previously, it was showcased as a concept model in March 2012. Based on the three-door 208, the variant weighs , which is  lighter than the 207 GTi.

Fitted with 17-inch alloy wheels with 205/45 tyre size, the 208 GTi is also equipped with a larger  disc brakes at the front, cooled by functional vents. Its suspension has also been upgraded and the steering recalibrated appropriately.

The GTi's Prince engine is shared with the Peugeot RCZ, several Mini and various Citroëns.

This first GTi model has since been replaced by the 208 GTi by PeugeotSport which is directly derived from the limited edition '30ème Anniversaire Edition' which put out 208 bhp with revised suspension and an optional two tone paint job, along with a facelift of the original bumpers and other small changes.

208 GTi 30th by Peugeot Sport

A limited edition "30th by Peugeot Sport" was launched to mark the 30th anniversary of the 205 GTi, launched in 1984. Equipped with a  engine, the model was tuned by Peugeot Sport, the brand's competition department. Improvements over the regular 208 GTi include a Torsen limited-slip differential from the RCZ R and performance-oriented suspension and steering settings. Braking is handled by front  discs pinched by 4-piston fixed Brembo calipers.

The car was shown at the 2014 Goodwood Festival of Speed. It went on sale the following November in France from €28,900, which was €3,800 more than a regular GTi.

Powertrain 
All the petrol engines comply with the Euro 5 norm and the diesel engines have  emissions of 99 g/km or lower. In addition to the four cylinder petrol engines carried over from the previous model, from September 2012, the 208 has been offered with two new three cylinder units with variable valve timing – the 1.0 VTi (68 hp) and 1.2 VTi (82 hp). 

A 1.2 L three cylinder is available with a turbocharger designated as the PureTech 110 S&S (available on the GT Line models and the allures) or without designated PureTech 82 S&S (available on the active, VTi, or XS). This engine is coupled to a five speed manual or a six speed automatic.  

Trims 
The 208 comes with a range of trims and specs. Starting from the entry model as of 2019:

 Active – Available with either a 1.2L Puretech 82 S&S Petrol  or a 1.5L BlueHDi Diesel, both come with a five speed manual. 
 Signature (also known as the Allure) – Comes with the same engine and gear box as the active but has different styling and alloys. 
 Tech Edition – As well as coming with the same engine as the active and signature it also comes with two additional engine variants. A 1.2 litre Puretech 110 turbocharged manual and an automatic version known as the EAT6, both three cylinders 
 GT-Line – This is the top of line model that is available from Peugeot. Coupled with the 1.2L 110 engines both six speed automatic and manual as well as the 1.5 litre diesel. This trim offers all the styling of a hot hatch, it has 16" alloys which are diamond cut.

Safety
The 208 in its most basic Latin American configuration with 2 airbags received 4 stars for adult occupants and 3 stars for toddlers from Latin NCAP in 2014.

The 208 in its most basic Latin American configuration with 2 airbags and no ESC received 2 stars for adult occupants and 3 stars for toddlers from Latin NCAP in 2016 (one level above 2010-2015).

Second generation (P21; 2019)
The second-generation 208 was unveiled at the Geneva Motor Show in March 2019, and officially went on sale across Europe over the summer. A fully electric version, named e-208, was also revealed at Geneva.

Since this generation, the 208 switches from the older PF1 platform to the Common Modular Platform (CMP). The newly developed platform also enhanced the vehicle's aerodynamics and comfort, as noise, vibration, and harshness (NVH) levels are claimed to be reduced compared to its predecessor.

The 208's interior has also been updated with Peugeot's i-Cockpit, featuring a digital instrument cluster, smaller steering wheel design and a touchscreen display available in various sizes. Physical buttons and switches have been minimized, as most of the controls have been integrated into the infotainment system. It is also available with optional advanced driver-assistance systems, featuring adaptive cruise control, lane centering, automatic parking, and blind spot monitoring.

Technical
The 208 offers a choice of powertrains, using conventional petrol or diesel engines, or an electric motor.

The diesel model will come in just one engine variant, a 1.5-litre four cylinder engine producing . Moroccan buyers have the option of the older 1.6 HDi engine producing . Peugeot have yet to announce the Sport models and what engine they will be using, such as the GTi which has been part of the family of the 208. 

However, Guillaume Clerc, the project manager for the second generation 208, stated that development of a petrol 208 GTi ended in 2017, because it was impossible to meet the corporate average  emission targets with the larger 1.6-litre engine used in the previous generation 208 GTi. Clerc hinted the next GTi could be based on the e-208.

e-208
Since the introduction of the second-generation 208, Peugeot also offers a battery electric version called the e-208. Unlike competing contemporary vehicles such as the Renault Zoe and Volkswagen ID.3, the e-208 shares a common chassis with the conventional petrol/diesel powered 208. Peugeot chose this deliberately to enable potential buyers to select the drivetrain that best suits their requirements. It also allows Peugeot to assemble the e-208 on the same line as the 208, at the Slovakian Trnava plant.

Compared to the conventionally powered versions of the 208, the e-208 is approximately  heavier, and has a slightly wider rear axle, to accommodate the battery pack.

The e-208 has a heat-pump controlled 50 kWh battery, a  motor, and a 6.6 kW charger. It is equipped with a CCS Combo Type 2 connector, and can charge at a rate of up to 100 kW from a suitable DC fast charging station. Charge rate can be 70kW up to 40% state of charge, then decreasing to 50kW. The onboard charger is limited to 7.4 kW, but may be equipped with a three phase 11 kW charger as an option. In the e208, the gear selector is used to choose the level of regenerative braking. 

Shortly after it went on sale in October 2019, demand for the e-208 was reported as strong. Peugeot had anticipated making approximately 30,000 e-208 cars per year, 10 percent of the planned annual production of 300,000 for the entire 208 product line, but  of all pre-orders received were for the e208. Maximum annual production for the e-208 is 60,000 units.

The electric e-208 was voted "Most Desired Electric Car" in North Macedonia at the Golden Steering Wheel awards at the beginning of 2021.

South American model 

In July 2020, Peugeot started the assembly of the second-generation 208 in Argentina in its Buenos Aires plant. The vehicles produced at this plant are intended for South American market, with 60 percent exported outside Argentina. Only internal combustion models are produced here, as the e-208 sold in South America are imported. 

In 2020, the Argentinian-made 208 was claimed to be 95 percent equal to the European version (but the engine is different, for starters), while 40% of its parts are made in Argentina. The South American model are engineered with a higher ground clearance (+10 to 12 mm) and a higher approach angle (16 degrees instead of 14 degrees) to adapt to the more rugged local roads than the European ones. It also uses less expensive materials, such as using steel instead of aluminum. Other differences include a different rear seats and a larger fuel tank.

The Argentinian-made 208 is equipped with the 1.6-litre VTi engine producing .

Since the second half of 2022, a portion of the 208 sold in Chile are coming from Argentina (in addition to the European model).

Powertrain (Europe)

Safety

Euro NCAP
The 208 in its standard European configuration received 4 stars from Euro NCAP in 2019.

Latin NCAP 
The 208 in its most basic Latin American configuration with 4 airbags and ISA received 2 stars from Latin NCAP in 2021 under its new protocol (one level above 2016-2019, similar to Euro NCAP 2014).

Sales 
Peugeot announced the 300,000th 208 was produced in February 2013.

Motorsport

208 T16 Pikes Peak

In April 2013, a 208 T16 was tested by Sébastien Loeb at Mont Ventoux. Loosely based on the shape and design of the production 208, the T16 is a lightweight  vehicle that uses the rear wing from the Peugeot 908, and has a 3.2 litre, twin turbo V6 engine, developing  and 0–100 km/h in just 1.8s with the aim of competing at the Pikes Peak International Hill Climb. The engine was derived from racing variants of the PSA ES/L V6 built by Sodemo, which were used in the Courage C60 Le Mans race car between 2001 and 2003.

At Pikes Peak on 30 June 2013, Sébastien Loeb used the 208 T16 to break Rhys Millen's record time, set in 2012 on the first fully paved roads in the history of the competition. The previous record of 9:46.164 was shattered, and a new record time of 8:13.878 was set.

The car also won the hillclimbing race, at the 2014 Goodwood Festival of Speed in June 2014.

Racing
In 2018, a Peugeot 208 GTi 30th Edition model won the overall award in the inaugural Classic Sports Car Club Turbo Tin Tops Series, for forced induction front wheel drive cars.

Rallycross

Team Peugeot-Hansen won the manufacturers title at the FIA World Rallycross Championship in November 2015. Jérôme Grosset-Janin was runner up in the FIA European Rallycross Championship in the same year.

Timmy Hansen won the 2019 FIA World Rallycross Championship using a Peugeot 208, and Hansen MJP won the teams championship.

Rally

Juha Salo won the Finnish Rally Championship in 2015 and 2016.

Notes

References

External links

 
 Peugeot 208 design story
 Peugeot 208 Official UAE Website

Cars introduced in 2012
Front-wheel-drive vehicles
Production electric cars
Hatchbacks
208
Rallycross cars
Sport compact cars
Subcompact cars
Euro NCAP superminis
Latin NCAP superminis
2020s cars